Manamin (also Romanized as Manāmīn; also known as Manāman, Mānāmūn, Manānom, and Mananum) is a village in Khvoresh Rostam-e Shomali Rural District, Khvoresh Rostam District, Khalkhal County, Ardabil Province, Iran. At the 2006 census, its population was 357, in 111 families.

References 

Towns and villages in Khalkhal County